Khorog Airport,  is an airport serving Khorugh (also spelled Khorog), a city in the Gorno-Badakhshan Autonomous Province in Tajikistan.

Facilities and aircraft
Aga Khan Foundation has plans to build a new runway at the airport.

Airlines and destinations

References

External links
 Airport Guide
 Aviation Safety Network
 World Airport Codes

Airports in Tajikistan
Gorno-Badakhshan Autonomous Region